Mohammed Umara Kumalia is a politician in the Pan-African Parliament of Nigeria. He was the 1999 APP leader. He was a member of the House of Representatives of Nigeria  from 1999-2007 and the minority leader from 1999-2003.

References 

Members of the Pan-African Parliament from Nigeria
Living people
1967 births